"Sixteen Going on Seventeen" is a show tune from the 1959 Rodgers and Hammerstein musical The Sound of Music.

Background
The lyrics of the song state that Liesl is a young girl at the beginning of her womanhood, and that she can depend on Rolf for guidance, because he is a good year older. Since the comparative maturity of the two characters is the opposite of that expressed in the song, this is an example of lyrical irony.

A reprise of "Sixteen Going on Seventeen" is also sung by Maria and Liesl when the Captain and Maria came back from their honeymoon and Rolf has rejected Liesl. In the stage version, there is an introduction to the reprise for Maria to sing. This quatrain was originally written as the verse intro to Climb Ev'ry Mountain but reassigned to the Sixteen Going on Seventeen reprise later on.   
It was cut from the film version of The Sound of Music, but included on reissues of the soundtrack recording.

In the motion picture version, the song was filmed in and around a gazebo which is still visited by hundreds of tourists each day doing "Sound of Music" tours around Salzburg though the gazebo interiors were filmed in Hollywood. Charmian Carr was actually 21 years old when the song was filmed.

State Farm remix
State Farm Insurance released an advertisement campaign, featuring a remix of the show tune as a rock song. It was produced by the audio production firm Modern Music.

In popular culture
This song was used twice on Family Guy. The song is heard in the episode "Family Gay" and Lois sings the song to her daughter Meg in the episode "Peter's Two Dads," trying to guess how old she is.

The song was reimagined by Dawn French and Jennifer Saunders in an episode of their sketch show French and Saunders where, as one of several sketches based on the movie, the two sit in the gazebo singing the lyrics "I am French/And you are Saunders".

The song was used as the outro music for "Tea Leaves," a fifth-season episode of the US television series Mad Men.

The song was used in the 1996 British film Beautiful Thing. On the second night they share a bed, Jamie kisses Ste for the first time, and the song is heard playing at the end of the scene. The song continues playing through to the following scenes.

On May 4, 2000, Julia Louis-Dreyfus was a guest on the Late Show with David Letterman, ending her visit on the show by performing a rendition of the song with fellow Seinfeld co-star, Jerry Seinfeld himself.

A movie in 2004, 13 Going on 30, is named after this, and also includes a parody.

Seohyun of Korean pop group Girls' Generation did a cover of it for their "Into the New World tour". It was later put on the tour album.

It is a part of the play in The Pacifier (starring Vin Diesel).

The song is used by WGR 550 in Buffalo leading into discussions about the Bills playoff drought.

The "Sixteen Going on Seventeen" scene is featured on The Orville episode "If the Stars Should Appear" when Klyden asks to see something to make him happy in addition to eating rocky road ice cream as "depression food" following an argument with Bortus.

Laibach did a cover of the song for their "The Sound of Music" album, which was inspired by their 2015 tour in North Korea.

References

1959 songs
Songs with music by Richard Rodgers
Songs with lyrics by Oscar Hammerstein II
Songs from The Sound of Music
Vocal duets